Chrysoteuchia ningensis is a moth in the family Crambidae. It was described by Wei-Chun Li in 2012. It is found in Ningxia, China.

References

Crambini
Moths described in 2012
Moths of Asia